Psyche is a planned orbiter mission to explore the origin of planetary cores by studying the metallic asteroid of the same name. Lindy Elkins-Tanton of Arizona State University is the principal investigator who proposed this mission for NASA's Discovery Program. NASA's Jet Propulsion Laboratory (JPL) will manage the project.

16 Psyche is the heaviest known M-type asteroid, and was once thought to be the exposed iron core of a protoplanet, the remnant of a violent collision with another object that stripped off its mantle and crust. Numerous recent studies have all but ruled that out. Radar observations of the asteroid from Earth indicate an iron–nickel composition. On January 4, 2017, the Psyche mission was selected for NASA's Discovery #14 mission, and launch was scheduled for no earlier than September 20, 2022. On June 24, 2022, the Psyche launch was postponed until at least 2023. As of October 2022, Psyche is scheduled to launch no earlier than October 10, 2023.

History 

Psyche was submitted as part of a call for proposals for NASA's Discovery Program that closed in February 2015. It was shortlisted on September 30, 2015, as one of five finalists and awarded US$3 million for further concept development.

On January 4, 2017, Psyche was selected for the 14th Discovery mission, with launch set for 2023. In May 2017, the launch date was moved up to target a more efficient trajectory, launching in July 2022 aboard a SpaceX Falcon Heavy launch vehicle and arriving on January 31, 2026, following a Mars gravity assist on May 23, 2023.

In June 2022 NASA found that the late delivery of the testing equipment and flight software for the Psyche spacecraft did not give them enough time to complete the required testing, and decided to delay the launch, with future  windows available in 2023 and 2024 to rendezvous with the asteroid in 2029 and 2030, respectively.

On October 28, 2022, NASA announced that Psyche was targeting a launch period opening on October 10, 2023, which would correspond with an arrival at the asteroid in August 2029.

An independent review of the delays at JPL reported in November 2022 found understaffing, insufficient planning, and communications issues among engineers and with management. The VERITAS Venus mission was delayed to free up staff to focus on Psyche.

Mission overview 
The Psyche spacecraft is designed with solar electric propulsion, and the scientific payload includes a multispectral imager, a magnetometer, and a gamma-ray spectrometer.

The mission is designed to perform 21 months of science. The spacecraft was built by NASA Jet Propulsion Laboratory (JPL) in collaboration with SSL (formerly Space Systems/Loral) and Arizona State University.

It was proposed that the rocket launch might be shared with a separate mission named Athena, that would perform a single flyby of asteroid 2 Pallas, the third-largest asteroid in the Solar System. In May 2020, it was announced that the Falcon Heavy carrying Psyche would include two smallsat secondary payloads to study the Martian atmosphere and binary asteroids, named EscaPADE (Escape and Plasma Acceleration and Dynamics Explorers) and Janus respectively, but in September 2020, the EscaPADE Mars atmosphere probe was removed from the plan. Janus was later removed from the Psyche mission as well on  November 18, 2022, after an assessment determined that it would not be on the required trajectory to meet its science requirements as a result of Psyche’s new launch period.

Science goals and objectives 

Differentiation was a fundamental process in shaping many asteroids and all terrestrial planets, and direct exploration of a core could greatly enhance understanding of this process. The Psyche mission aims to characterize 16 Psyche's geology, shape, elemental composition, magnetic field, and mass distribution. It is expected that this mission will increase the understanding of planetary formation and interiors.

Specifically, the science goals for the mission are:
 Understand a previously unexplored building block of planet formation: iron cores.
 Look inside terrestrial planets, including Earth, by directly examining the interior of a differentiated body, which otherwise could not be seen.
 Explore a new type of world, made of metal.

The science objectives are:
 Determine whether 16 Psyche is a core, or if it is unmelted material.
 Determine the relative ages of regions of 16 Psyche's surface.
 Determine whether small metal bodies incorporate the same light elements as are expected in the Earth's high-pressure core.
 Determine whether 16 Psyche was formed under conditions more oxidizing or more reducing than Earth's core.
 Characterize 16 Psyche's topography.

The science questions this mission aims to address are:
 Is 16 Psyche the stripped core of a differentiated planetesimal, or was it formed as an iron-rich body? What were the building blocks of planets? Did planetesimals that formed close to the Sun have very different bulk compositions?
 If 16 Psyche was stripped of its mantle, when and how did that occur?
 If 16 Psyche was once molten, did it solidify from the inside out, or the outside in?
 Did 16 Psyche produce a magnetic dynamo as it cooled?
 What are the major alloy elements that coexist in the iron metal of the core?
 What are the key characteristics of the geologic surface and global topography? Does 16 Psyche look radically different from known stony and icy bodies?
 How do craters on a metal body differ from those in rock or ice?

Instruments 

 The Multispectral Imager will provide high-resolution images using filters to discriminate between metallic and silicate constituents.
 The Gamma-ray and Neutron Spectrometer will analyze and map the asteroid's elemental composition.
 The Magnetometer will measure and map the remnant magnetic field of the asteroid.
 The X-band Gravity Science Investigation will use the X-band (microwave) radio telecommunications system to measure the asteroid's gravity field and deduce its interior structure.

Spacecraft 
The spacecraft bus is the Space Systems Loral (SSL) 1300 platform. JPL added the command and data handling and telecom subsystems and all flight software.

Propulsion 

This mission will use four of the model SPT-140 engine, a Hall-effect thruster utilizing solar electric propulsion, where electricity generated from solar panels is transmitted to an electric, rather than chemically powered, rocket engine. The thruster is nominally rated at 4.5 kW operating power, but it will also operate for long durations at about 900 watts. Psyche will be the first mission to use Hall-effect thrusters beyond lunar orbit.

The SPT-140 (SPT stands for Stationary Plasma Thruster) is a production line commercial propulsion system that was invented in the USSR by OKB Fakel and developed by NASA's Glenn Research Center, Space Systems Loral, and Pratt & Whitney since the late 1980s. The SPT-140 thruster was first tested in U.S. as a 3.5 kW unit in 2002 as part of the Air Force Integrated High Payoff Rocket Propulsion Technology program.

Using solar electric thrusters will allow the spacecraft to arrive at 16 Psyche (at 3.3 astronomical units) much faster while consuming only 10% of the propellant it would need using conventional chemical propulsion.

Power 

Electricity will be generated by bilateral solar panels in an X-shaped configuration, with five panels on each side. Prior to the mission being moved forward with a new trajectory, the panels were to be arranged in straight lines, with only four panels on each side of the spacecraft.

Laser communications experiment 

The spacecraft will also test an experimental laser communication technology called Deep Space Optical Communications (DSOC). It is hoped that the device will be able to increase spacecraft communications performance and efficiency by 10 to 100 times over conventional means. Deep Space Optical Communications (DSOC) experiment is NASA's first demonstration of optical communications beyond the Earth-Moon system. DSOC is a system that consists of a flight laser transceiver, a ground laser transmitter, and a ground laser receiver. New technologies have been implemented in each of these elements. The transceiver is mounted on the Psyche spacecraft. The DSOC technology demonstration will begin shortly after launch and continue as the spacecraft travels from Earth to its gravity-assist flyby of Mars. DSOC operations are planned for one year after launch, with extended-mission opportunities to be evaluated. Palomar Observatory's Hale Telescope will receive the high-rate data downlink from the DSOC flight transceiver.

The Discovery program solicitation offered mission projects an extra $30 M if they would host and test the 25 kg DSOC unit which needs about 75 Watts. It is hoped to advance DSOC to TRL 6. DSOC tests should begin about 60 days after launch. The test-runs of the laser equipment will occur over distances of 0.1 to 2.5 astronomical units (AU) on the outward-bound probe.

Flight hardware: The DSOC flight laser transceiver will feature a near-infrared laser transmitter to send high-rate data to the ground system, and a sensitive photon-counting camera to receive a ground-transmitted laser. The transceiver's 8.6-inch (22-centimeter) aperture telescope is mounted on an assembly of struts and actuators that stabilizes the optics from spacecraft vibrations. The flight hardware is fitted with a sunshade and protrudes from the side of the spacecraft, making it one of Psyche'''s easily identifiable features.

Ground systems: A high-power near-infrared laser transmitter at the Jet Propulsion Laboratory's Table Mountain facility near Wrightwood, California, will uplink a modulated laser beam to the flight transceiver and demonstrate the transmission of low-rate data. The uplink laser will also act as a beacon for the flight transceiver to lock onto. The downlink data sent back by the DSOC transceiver on Psyche will be collected by the 200-inch (5.1-meter) Hale Telescope at Caltech's Palomar Observatory in San Diego County, California, using a sensitive superconducting nanowire photon-counting receiver to demonstrate high-rate data transfer.

 Operations 

 Launch and trajectory 
As of October 2022, Psyche is scheduled to launch no earlier than October 10, 2023, on a Falcon Heavy vehicle. The cost of the launch is US$117 million. Psyche will conduct a gravity assist maneuver at Mars in 2026, which will position the spacecraft for arrival at the target asteroid in August 2029.

 Orbit regimes Psyche'' is scheduled to enter orbit around 16 Psyche in August 2029. The spacecraft would orbit at decreasing altitudes or regimes. Its first regime, would see the spacecraft enter a  orbit for magnetic field characterization and preliminary mapping for a duration of 56 days. It will also acquire continued imaging, gravity, and magnetic field mapping. The mission is expected to orbit the asteroid for at least 21 months.

Ground stations for laser link 
The laser beams from the spacecraft will be received by a ground telescope at Palomar Observatory in California. Laser beams to the spacecraft will be sent from a smaller telescope at JPL Table Mountain Facility.

Construction and pre-launch testing

Testing 

Testing began on the spacecraft in December 2021. These tests include but are not limited to electromagnetic testing and TVAC, or thermal vacuum chamber testing. The electromagnetic testing is conducted to ensure that the electronics and magnetic components that make up the spacecraft will not interfere with each other while conducting the mission. The TVAC testing was conducted inside the 85 by 25 foot vacuum chamber at JPL's facility in Southern California, which replicates the lack of air in space. This allows for the engineers and scientist to observe the effects of the space environment on the obiter. Inside the TVAC the JPL employees can observe how well the spacecraft reacts to harsh conditions. Without air surrounding the spacecraft the heating and cooling of the unit is affected. The spacecraft will be hot in the hours after launch, when it’s still close to Earth and facing the Sun, especially with its electronics running, and later, when the spacecraft gets farther from the Sun, it faces intense cold, especially when flying in Psyche's shadow. Vibration tests of the spacecraft by scientists and engineers ensure it can survive the extreme conditions of the rocket launch. They also performed shock testing to ensure the spacecraft could survive the shock of separation from the rocket's second stage. Finally, they performed acoustic testing on the craft. The sound of the launch can be so violent that it can damage the hardware, so intense acoustic testing was performed to ensure mission success.

References

External links 

 Mission website at NASA.gov
 Mission website by Arizona State University
 

Discovery Program
Laser communication in space
Missions to main-belt asteroids
Proposed NASA space probes